The 2020–21 season was the 88th season of competitive football in Lebanon. The season officially began on 3 October 2020 with the Lebanese Premier League.

National teams

Lebanon national football team

Kits

Results and fixtures

Friendlies

2022 FIFA World Cup qualification

Second round: Group H

2021 FIFA Arab Cup

Qualification

Lebanon women's national football team

Results and fixtures

Armenia Friendly Tournament

Men's football

AFC Cup

Group stage

Group A

Group B

Lebanese Premier League

Lebanese Second Division

Lebanese Third Division

Group A

Group B

Group C

Group D

Promotion play-offs

Cup competitions

Lebanese FA Cup

Final

Lebanese Elite and Challenge Cup 
The 2020 Lebanese Elite and Challenge Cup was intended to be the first, and only, edition of the tournament. Due to the 2019–20 Lebanese Premier League being canceled, the tournament was supposed to feature a joint-qualifying tournament for the Lebanese Elite Cup and Lebanese Challenge Cup between the 12 Lebanese Premier League teams, to decide which six teams would have played in the Elite Cup, and which six in the Challenge Cup. The 12 Lebanese Premier League teams were divided in three groups of four: the top two teams of each group would qualify to the Elite Cup, whereas the bottom two would qualify to the Challenge Cup.

The Lebanese Elite and Challenge Cup was supposed to kick off on 22 August 2020 with the preparatory tournament. Initially scheduled to begin on 29 July, the tournament was first postponed to 1 August, then to 10 August in order to raise preventive measures towards the COVID-19 pandemic. The starting date was finally postponed to 22 August following the 2020 Beirut explosions. On 19 August, the Lebanese Football Association (LFA) cancelled the tournament altogether as part of preventive measures to combat the COVID-19 outbreak.

Women's football

Lebanese Women's Football League

Group A

Group B

Final six

Cup competitions

Lebanese Women's FA Cup

Notes

References 

 
Seasons in Lebanese football
2020 in Lebanese sport
2021 in Lebanese sport
Lebanon
Lebanon
2020 sport-related lists
2021 sport-related lists